Manteyer is a commune in the Hautes-Alpes department of the Provence-Alpes-Côte d'Azur region in Southeastern France. In 2017, it had a population of 429. Its inhabitants are called Manteyards in French.

Population

See also
Communes of the Hautes-Alpes department

References

Communes of Hautes-Alpes